Ramesh Lal Bijlani (born 1947) is an Indian writer, inspirational speaker, medical scientist and retired Professor of Physiology who has specialized in physiology, nutrition, and yoga. He is the author of more than 200 scientific papers, more than 50 popular articles, and 14 books, including a 1000-page textbook for medical students and teachers, Understanding Medical Physiology (2004), and a 32-page picture book for 5- to 8-year-olds, Our Body: A Wonderful Machine (1986), which was the best selling title published by the National Book Trust for the decade 1995–2005. Professor & Head of Department at Department of Physiology, B. P. Koirala Institute of Health Sciences, Dharan, Nepal from 1996-2000 AD.

Biography

Awards

Lifetime Achievement Award from the Association of Physiologists and Pharmacologists of India (APPI) in 2010. Bijlani gave a presentation during the award ceremony in March 2011 called "What is Life for Anyway?" Excerpts from the talk are on YouTube.

Bibliography
 Eating Scientifically, Orient Longmans; 1974. .
 Our Body: a wonderful machine, National Book Trust (India); 1986. .
 The Human Machine: how to prevent breakdowns, National Book Trust (India); 1990. .
 Nutrition: a practical approach, Jaypee; 1992. .
 Understanding Medical Physiology, Jaypee; 3rd edition, 2004. 
 B.K. Anand: easy to admire, difficult to emulate, Jaypee; 1997. .
 Fundamentals of Physiology, Jaypee; 2001. .
 The Return of Ram, Gurgaon: Scholastics; 2006, .
 Medical Research: all you wanted to know but did not know whom to ask, Jaypee; 2008. .
 Back to Health through Yoga, Rupa; 2008. .
 Eating Wisely and Well, Rupa; 2012. 
 Kavya Makes Up Her Mind, National Book Trust (India); 2014. 
 Kavya ka Faisla (Hindi Translation by the author), National Book Trust (India); 2015. 
 The School Called Marriage: how to graduate with flying colours (Co-author), Hay House (India); 2015. 
 A Primer on Yoga: theory and practice, National Book Trust (India); 2015.

Notes

External links
 

1947 births
Living people
Diet food advocates
Health and wellness writers
Indian spiritual writers
Indian nutritionists
People from Sukkur District
Academic staff of the All India Institute of Medical Sciences, New Delhi
All India Institute of Medical Sciences, New Delhi alumni
Fellows of the National Academy of Medical Sciences
Pakistani emigrants to India